Tariq Abdul Haleem (طارق عبد الحليم) is an Egyptian Islamist cleric residing in Canada in Ontario's city of Mississauga and head of the Dar al-Arqam institution there. Tariq Abdul Haleem, along with Abu Qatada, Abu Muhammad al-Maqdisi, and Hani al-Sibai was praised by Ayman al-Zawahiri, the leader of Al-Qaeda. He was born on September 1, 1948, in the al-Jami' ul-Isma'ili area of Cairo. His father was a former head of Tax cassation and a lawyer named Abdul Hafeedh Ahmad from a family of Upper Egypt origins in Qena Governorate. His maternal great grandfather was a native of the Beheira Governorate called Saleem bin Abi Firaj al Bishri, who was a Shaykh al-Islām. His maternal grandfather was Abdul Azeez al Bishri, a memorizer of Hadith, and his mother was Zaynab Abdul Azeez Saleem al-Bishri.

Tariq Abdul Haleem posted a video of himself a "message to the Mujahideen of Egypt" in the aftermath of the overthrow of the Muslim Brotherhood President Morsi calling for violent jihad, and shedding of blood against Egyptian leader Abdel Fattah el-Sisi, cursing Sisi and calling him a Jew, accusing Sisi of being pro-Christian, pro-Coptic and supporting the Coptic Pope.

Tariq declared liberals and secularists as "infidels" and called for them to be killed, in his hopes of accelerate a violent clash between Islamists and secularists and liberals. His work was published by jihadist fugitive Hani al-Siba'i who is wanted in Egypt. Hani al-Sibai wrote an article defending Tariq Abdul Haleem from criticism. Tariq Abdul Haleem issued a joint statement with Hani al-Siba'i on ISIS in 2014.

An article engaging in 9/11 truther denial in the Arab times, credited information to Tariq Abdul Haleem.

Tariq gave an interview explaining the role of an Imam in a Mosque to the life of Muslim people. Qaweem wrote an article rebutting Tariq over Tariq's attacks on Tarhuni.

In an article published in the 19th edition of the Turkistan Islamic Party's magazine "Islamic Turkistan" Tariq Abdul Haleem named Buddhists as the enemy in "Turkistan".:38 The Gulf, Jordan, the Levant, and Egypt were named was places of the internal enemy while the Caucasus, Chechnya, Afghanistan, and Turkistan were named as the places of the occupying enemy by Tariq Abdul Haleem.:44

See also 
Wagdy Ghoneim
Sayyid Qutb
Muhammad Surur
Abdul Razzaq al-Mahdi
Abdullah al-Muhaysini

References 

Living people
Clergy from Cairo
1948 births
Egyptian imams
Egyptian Salafis
Egyptian Islamists
Egyptian emigrants to Canada
Egyptian Muslim scholars of Islam